Christopher Britton may refer to:

Chris Britton (baseball) (born 1982), Major League Baseball relief pitcher
Christopher Britton (actor) (born 1961), Canadian actor and voice actor
Chris Britton of The Troggs